Haskell Memorial Stadium is a sport stadium in Lawrence, Kansas.  The facility is primarily used by Haskell Indian Nations University for college football and formerly by local high school teams.
Haskell discontinued their football program in 2015.

References

College football venues
Haskell Indian Nations Fighting Indians football
American football venues in Kansas
Buildings and structures in Lawrence, Kansas
1926 establishments in Kansas
Sports venues completed in 1926
High school football venues in the United States